Nevado Anallajsi is a stratovolcano in Bolivia. The date of its last eruption is unknown, but its youngest lava flows appear to have erupted from a vent on the north flank of the mountain. The main composition of the volcano is andesitic and dacitic. It overlies a plateau which is composed of ignimbrite.

See also
 List of volcanoes in Bolivia

References

Sources

Stratovolcanoes of Bolivia
Subduction volcanoes
Polygenetic volcanoes
Volcanoes of La Paz Department (Bolivia)
Five-thousanders of the Andes
Pleistocene stratovolcanoes